Gareth Rees may refer to:

Gareth Rees (cricketer) (born 1985), Welsh cricketer
Gareth Rees (motorsport commentator) (born 1969), Welsh motorsport commentator
Gareth Rees (rugby union) (born 1967), former Canadian rugby player